École Secondaire Catholique Marie-Rivier (Marie-Rivier Catholic High School) is a French language high school for grades 7-12 located in Kingston, Ontario, Canada. It is part of the St-François d'Assise parish. The school has an enrichment program for grades 7-8, which includes more projects (such as mandatory participation in the regional science fair) accompanied by more individual learning of the material normally covered during those grades. The school also provides a STEM focus program, the most renowned parts of which are 3D model creations/printing and robotics. There is a specialised Dance focus program, as well as a very well-ranked Hockey focus program. There are no AP nor IB options offered. Additional information can be found on the official school website.

New school 

The new school is planned to merge with the École secondaire publique Mille-Îles. The school is planned to be finished by March 2023 and to include cutting-edge technology. It will be situated along the soon-to-be-built, Demers Ave and Rockwell Ave not too far from Taylor Kidd Blvd. The up to date google maps location can be found: Here. The schools will be sharing different areas such as; a cafeteria, a library, a theatre that can accommodate 258 people, laboratory rooms, technological workshops, two gymnasiums and a physical activity room

Student Government (GDE) 2022-2023
Première ministre→  Ruby sinclair

Vice première ministre→  Blake Conod 

Ministre des affaires intermédiaires→  Sadie Marie

Ministre des affaires extérieures→  Colesen Lebrun

Ministre culturel des evenement→  Clara Bédard

Ministre culturel d'esprit d'ecole→ Sonia malik

Ministre sportif→  Roxane Walsh

Ministre de l’environnement→  Madeleine fleming

Ministre du bien-être→  Jolie Gorgie

Représentant du personnel→ Mme. Anick Arseneault et Mme. Myriam Burton

See also
List of high schools in Ontario

References

External links

Official school homepage 
Official school board homepage 

French-language high schools in Ontario
High schools in Kingston, Ontario
Catholic secondary schools in Ontario
Educational institutions in Canada with year of establishment missing